Hohtenn is a railway station in the Swiss canton of Valais and municipality of Steg-Hohtenn. The station is located on the Lötschberg line of the BLS AG.

The station is served by the following passenger train:

Hohten station is the starting point of the Lötschberg South Ramp walking trail, which parallels the south ramp of the Lötschberg railway as it descends the northern flank of the Rhone valley into Brig.

References

External links 

Railway stations in the canton of Valais
BLS railway stations